Alla Kudryavtseva and Anastasia Rodionova were the defending champions, but they chose not to participate together this year. Kudryavtseva played with Alexandra Panova, but lost in the quarterfinals to Martina Hingis and Sabine Lisicki. Rodionova played with Arina Rodionova, but lost in the quarterfinals to Hsieh Su-wei and Sania Mirza.
Hingis and Lisicki won the title, defeating Caroline Garcia and Katarina Srebotnik in the final, 6–2, 7–5.

Seeds

Draw

Draw

References 
Main Draw

Brisbane International Doubles
Women's Doubles